Donald Friske (born November 9, 1961) is an American politician and businessman who served as a member of the Wisconsin State Assembly from 2001 to 2011.

Early life and education 
Born in Tomahawk, Wisconsin, Friske graduated from the Tomahawk High School and served in the United States Army from 1979 to 1985.

Career 
Friske served in the Wisconsin State Assembly from January 3, 2001, through January 2, 2011. In March 2010, Friske announced his retirement from the State Assembly, and was succeeded by Tom Tiffany. Friske now operates Carquest AutoParts franchises in Merrill and Tomahawk, Wisconsin. He had previously worked as a deputy sheriff.

Friske also served as Assistant Deputy Secretary of the Wisconsin Department of Corrections.

Personal life 
He lives in Merrill, Wisconsin. Friske is married and has three children.

Notes

People from Tomahawk, Wisconsin
Military personnel from Wisconsin
Businesspeople from Wisconsin
1961 births
Living people
21st-century American politicians
People from Merrill, Wisconsin
Republican Party members of the Wisconsin State Assembly